Charles May (1818?–1879) was a British police officer who spent 34 years in colonial service in Hong Kong, where he served as the first head of the Hong Kong Police Force (1845) and head of the Hong Kong Fire Brigade (now Hong Kong Fire Service) in 1868.

Life and career
He was born in London to John May, Superintendent of A Division of the Metropolitan Police. May himself joined that force on 7 November 1835 with his father as his sole referee, rising to Sergeant on 21 November 1837 and Inspector on 7 June 1839 before leaving England for Hong Kong, arriving on 28 February 1845 and remaining its Captain Superintendent of Police until 1862.

May remained in the colony, serving in various other posts such as Police Magistrate, Acting Colonial Treasurer and Superintendent of the Fire Brigade. May left Hong Kong on 22 April 1879 but died at sea near Singapore on 25 April 1879. Buried at sea, he is noted on the family tomb at Kensal Green Cemetery.

May was survived by his wife Harriet and daughter.

See also
 May House (Hong Kong)

References

External links
 Hong Kong Police Force Police History: The First Century

Further reading
 

1879 deaths
Hong Kong Police Force
British colonial police officers
Year of birth uncertain
Burials at sea
British expatriates in Hong Kong
People from London
Metropolitan Police officers